Steingraeber & Söhne  is a piano manufacturer in Bayreuth, Germany.

This family-owned business has its headquarters in Steingraeber Haus, a historic Rococo palace in Bayreuth. Udo Schmidt-Steingraeber is the sixth generation of Steingraebers to lead the family business.

History 
The company's forebears came from a family in Rudolstadt, Thuringia that built harpsichords. The family was subsequently based in Neustadt an der Orla, where it took up instrument building. Eduard Steingraeber was born in 1823; he first apprenticed with his uncle, Gottlieb Steingraeber, in Neustadt an der Orla. During his years of travel, he worked in a number of places, including the workshop of the Viennese piano builder Nannette Streicher, daughter of the well-known Augsburg piano maker, Andreas Stein. While there, he was permitted to accompany Franz Liszt on his concert tours, where he looked after the pianos and grand pianos that Liszt "demolished" at his performances. In 1852, Eduard Steingraeber founded the Pianofortefabrik Steingraeber (Steingraeber Piano Factory) in Bayreuth. Steingraeber purchased the Liebhardt Palace on Friedrichstraße in 1871 and made it the head office of the company. It has borne the name of Steingraeber Haus ever since. The company rapidly became the largest piano factory in Bavaria. Steingraeber has also supplied pianos to the Wagner family and to the Bayreuther Festspiele since the festival began in 1876. In 1881, Richard Wagner commissioned the instrument known as the Parsifal bell, which is used in the temple scenes of his opera, Parsifal.

During high volume production periods, Steingraeber's more than thirty employees, including twelve piano builders, specialise in the manufacture of high-quality pianos that are still predominantly handcrafted. The cases are constructed of solid wood and no particle board is ever used. Steingraeber & Söhne even treats the surfaces of the piano case with shellac and wax instead of polyester and synthetic resin varnishes. The company has sought technical solutions to simplify piano playing for wheelchair users and, above all, to provide them with a serviceable alternative to working the pedals with their feet. 

Steingraeber currently produces some forty uprights and seventy grand pianos per year. Since the company was founded, however, Steingraeber & Söhne has built over 40,000 grand and upright pianos.

Developments and innovations 

At the 2008 Frankfurt Music Fair, Steingraeber & Söhne introduced a new grand piano that measures 232 cm in length, as well as a grand piano with a carbon fibre soundboard. This type of construction enhances stability when tuning instruments that are subject to extreme climatic fluctuations. If grand pianos are to be housed in the tropics or played at outdoor concerts, for example, then carbon fibre soundboards make good sense. The left pedal mechanism has been enhanced: when a pianist depresses the left pedal, this causes the mechanism to shift in the usual way. If he/she continues to depress the pedal, the hammers move closer to the strings, which is similar to what happens in uprights. This facilitates playing at extremely soft, pianissimo dynamic levels. Steingraeber has developed an alternative means of guiding the strings over the bridge; it is based upon earlier ideas that were implemented in trials. Normally, the strings go over two bridge pins in a zigzag pattern. In the case of the Steingraeber alternative, bridge agraffes guide the string through a metal roller and press it down onto the bridge from above. In addition, height-adjustable hitch pins allow the string tension to be adjusted. The thinking behind this design feature is twofold: uniform string tension over the bridge improves energy transmission, and when significant string friction at the bridge pins no longer exists, the ability to tune and to hold a tuning is optimized. At the moment, these are not standard features in the production of grand pianos; clients may order them for an additional fee, however.

At Steingraeber, a ball bearing mechanism is available as an alternative to the standard, leather-covered knuckle roller mechanism. Thus, a lower-friction release of the jack makes improved repetition possible. In upright pianos, Steingraeber incorporates a magnet, rather than a spring, into the tip of the jack and the hammer-butt. The magnet brings the jack back into operating position after it releases. This system is maintenance free and results in faster, more precise repetition.

Models 
Steingraeber manufactures grand pianos in lengths of 170, 192, 212, 232, and 272 cm. Uprights come in 122, 130, and 138 cm in height.

As of 2020 only 60 grands and 60 uprights are being made each year.

Current grand piano models

Current upright piano models

Phoenix Pianos partnership 
Hurstwood Farm Piano Studios have a partnership with Steingraeber & Söhne to make pianos with a new technology. Steingraeber ships unfinished piano acoustic cases and frames to Hurstwood Farm piano factory in Kent, England, where they receive carbon fiber soundboards, carbon fiber bridge caps, 3-D printed “D3D” actions, stainless steel strings and finished. This pianos are sold under the Phoenix Pianos brand.

References

External links 

Bayreuth
Companies based in Bavaria
German brands
Piano manufacturing companies of Germany
Piano manufacturing companies